Robert Brasillach (31 March 1909 – 6 February 1945) was a French author and journalist. Brasillach was the editor of Je suis partout, a nationalist newspaper which advocated fascist movements and supported Jacques Doriot. After the liberation of France in 1944, he was executed following a trial and Charles de Gaulle's express refusal to grant him a pardon. Brasillach was executed for advocating collaborationism, denunciation and incitement to murder. The execution remains a subject of some controversy, because Brasillach was executed for "intellectual crimes", rather than military or political actions.

Biography
Robert Brasillach was born in Perpignan on 31 March 1909, the son of Lieutenant Arthémile Brasillach, who served in the colonial regiment of Marshall Lyautey in Morocco, and Marguerite Brasillach, née Redo. He studied at the École normale supérieure, at the time a school of the University of Paris, and then became a novelist and literary critic for the Action française of Charles Maurras. After the 6 February 1934 crisis in the Place de la Concorde, Brasillach openly supported fascism. His politics are shared by several of the protagonists in his literary works, notably the two male main characters in The Seven Colours (see below).

Author
Brasillach wrote both fiction and non-fiction. While his fiction dealt with love, life and politics in his era, his non-fiction dealt with a great variety of themes, ranging from drama, great literary figures and contemporary world events. His work in the realm of cinema history (see below) was particularly influential.

Cinema
Brasillach was fascinated by the cinema and in 1935 co-wrote a detailed critical history of that medium, Histoire du cinéma (re-edited in 1943), with his brother-in-law, Maurice Bardèche. This work remained the "most prominent aesthetic history of film for at least a decade", and a work that exerted considerable influence, via its impact on Georges Sadoul (who nonetheless disliked the authors) until the 1970s. Unlike several other authors and critics of the time, Brasillach did not see cinema through an overtly political lens, although the 1943 edition of his work did contain anti-Semitic comments not present in the original. Despite being fervent nationalists and personally believing that each nation and people had a unique cinema, the authors instead focused on international trends rather than local particularities. Brasillach frequented Henri Langlois' Cercle du cinéma (Cinema Circle). His personal tastes are detailed in his writings of the period. These tastes ranged from Soviet cinema (Battleship Potemkin and Alexander Nevski) to film-makers Charlie Chaplin, G.W. Pabst, René Clair and Jean Renoir and to some Hollywood films from directors such as John Ford, Frank Borzage and King Vidor. Brasillach was drawn to originality and explored foreign cinema, and became the first major critic in France to address Japanese cinema, the work of Yasujirō Ozu, Kenji Mizoguchi and Heinosuke Gosho. While in prison, he worked on a third edition of his work on cinema and began to adapt a work on Falstaff which he hoped to film with Raimu.

Politics and wartime activities
He became an editor of Je suis partout, a fascist paper founded by dissidents from the Action Française and led by Pierre Gaxotte. Brasillach was attracted to the fascistic Rexist movement in Belgium, and wrote an article and later a book about the leader of the movement, Leon Degrelle. Brasillach admired what he perceived to be Degrelle's youth and charisma and Degrelle's insistence on being neither left nor right, supporting striking workers, encouraging love of God, the King and family and desiring to see the establishment of an anti-communist and anti-capitalist, Christian-influenced corporate state. Degrelle collaborated with the German occupation of Belgium and served in the Waffen-SS. Brasillach was also greatly impressed by José Antonio Primo de Rivera and his Falangist movement. By contrast, he described Mein Kampf as a "masterpiece of cretinism" in which Hitler appeared to be "a sort of enraged teacher."

A soldier in 1940, Brasillach was captured by the Germans and held prisoner for several months after the fall of France. At his trial, the prosecution alleged that his release was due to pro-German articles written while in captivity. He was freed in early 1941 and returned to his editorial role at Je suis partout. He wrote in favour of the Vichy regime but later embraced a more committed germanophile policy of collaboration and Nazi policies and began to criticize the Vichy state. He joined a group of French authors and artists in a trip to meet with German counterparts in Weimar and in November 1942 he supported the German militarisation of the unoccupied zone (Case Anton) under the Vichy government because it "reunited France".

He visited the site of the Katyn massacre, toured the Eastern Front, visited Legion of French Volunteers Against Bolshevism and wrote, on his return to France, that he had gone from embracing a collaboration due to reason and rationality to being a collaborator for reasons of the heart ("De collaborationiste de raison, je suis devenu collaborationiste de coeur.")  He published the names and addresses of Jews who had gone into hiding, called for the death of left-wing politicians, and in the summer of 1944 signed the call for the summary execution of all members of the French Resistance. He considered himself a "moderate" antisemite and was replaced as editor of Je suis partout in 1943 by the even more extreme Pierre-Antoine Cousteau. He was a member of the Groupe Collaboration, an initiative that encouraged close cultural ties between France and Germany. He worked for various journals, including Révolution nationale and le Petit Parisien. After the liberation of Paris, Brasillach hid in an attic, joking in his diary: "Jews have been living in cupboards for four years, why not imitate them?". He surrendered on September 14 when he heard that his mother had been arrested. He spent the next five months in prison and continued his literary endeavours while incarcerated.

Trial and execution
Brasillach was tried in Paris on 19 January 1945. The trial judge had served under Vichy. The prosecutor reiterated Brasillach's vehement antisemitism, linked his praise of Germany and denunciation of the Resistance to SS massacres in France and played upon homophobic sentiments by repeatedly drawing the jurors' attention to the author's homosexuality (alleged, but denied by those who knew him best), noting, inter alia, that he had slept with the enemy and approved of Germany's "penetration" of France. In so doing, the prosecution was making hay with Brasillach's own words, as he had suggested, as Liberation approached, that France had slept with Germany and would remember the experience fondly. Brasillach was sentenced to death. Brasillach responded to the outrage of some of his supporters then in attendance by saying "It's an honour!"

The death sentence caused an uproar in French literary circles and even some of Brasillach's political opponents protested. Resistance member and author François Mauriac, whom Brasillach had savaged in the press, circulated a petition to Charles De Gaulle to commute the sentence. This petition was signed by many of the leading lights of the French literary world, including Paul Valéry, Paul Claudel, Albert Camus,   Jean Cocteau, Colette, Arthur Honegger, Jean Anouilh and Thierry Maulnier. De Gaulle did not comply and Brasillach was executed by firing squad in Montrouge. It has been argued that De Gaulle refused to spare Brasillach because the author had on numerous occasions called for Georges Mandel's execution. De Gaulle admired Mandel, a prominent conservative politician (who happened to be Jewish), and who was murdered by the Milice during the closing days of the Occupation. Brasillach called out "But all the same, long live France!" ("Vive la France quand même!") immediately before his execution. He was buried in the cimetière de Charonne in the 20th Arrondissement of Paris. His brother-in-law, Maurice Bardèche, was later buried next to him.

Legacy
Brasillach sought to protect his own legacy as his life drew to a close. He composed several works while awaiting trial and execution, including a collection of verse and a letter to French youth of the future, explaining and justifying his actions (Lettre à un soldat de la classe de soixante (Lettre), see below). In Lettre he was unrepentant about his fascism, his anti-Semitism or his wartime activity, although he insisted that he had no idea that deported French Jews were being murdered.

Brasillach's trial and execution inspired Simone de Beauvoir's essay "An Eye for an Eye", in which she defended the role of emotion (especially hatred) in politics and the role of revenge in punishment.

His biographer Alice Kaplan noted that his death made him the "James Dean of French fascism" and a martyr to the extreme right. François Truffaut was both aware and appreciative of Brasillach, stating that Brasillach and Pierre Drieu La Rochelle shared similar political beliefs and that "views that earn their advocates by the death penalty are bound to be worthy of esteem."

Dominique Venner's Nouvelle Revue d'Histoire has praised the author's intellectual oeuvre.

A group called Association des Amis de Robert Brasillach celebrates the author's work and legacy.

Cultural references
The Jean-Luc Godard film Éloge de l'amour features the recitation of Brasillach's "Testament", written before his execution.
Brasillach is described in Jonathan Littell's novel Les Bienveillantes, where he is one of the fellow students of the main character Maximilian Aue.
French black metal band Peste Noire dedicated to Brasillach Psaume IV from the album Folkfuck Folie.

Works
Below is a list of Brasillach's oeuvre (fiction, non-fiction and poetry), including posthumous works. Certain works have been briefly summarised.

Novels
1932 Le Voleur d'étincelles (The Spark Thief/The Stealer of Sparks)
1934 L'Enfant de la nuit (Child of the Night)
1936 Le Marchand d'oiseaux (The Bird Merchant)
1937 Comme le temps passe (How The Time Passes By), nominated for Prix Femina 1937
1939 Les Sept Couleurs (The Seven Colors), nominated for Prix Goncourt 1939.

The book begins with the courtship of Patrice and Catherine, two students, in Paris in the 1920s. At one point the young couple meet two children, who are also called Patrice and Catherine and who claim to be a couple. His studies completed, Patrice leaves to work in Italy, where he becomes enamoured with Italian fascism. Catherine, desiring a more stable relationship, eventually marries a Communist she has met at the office where she works, François. Patrice leaves Italy and serves a five-year stint in the Foreign Legion, where he befriends a young Nazi. After his time in the Legion, Patrice goes to work in Nazi Germany, where he finds Nazi ritual (e.g. Nuremberg rallies, the banners and marches) very engaging. Patrice learns from a friend from his Paris days that François has become a fascist, having turned from both Communism and the Third Republic following the 6 February 1934 crisis in which the extreme right rioted against government "corruption" and perhaps planned to overthrow the state. Ten years after he last saw Catherine, Patrice returns to Paris to visit Catherine and she agrees to go away with him but asks for a few days to collect her thoughts. She decides to stay with François instead, but François misunderstands and believes she has left him. François leaves France without a word and joins the Nationalist cause in the Spanish Civil War, where he has a brief encounter with the Nazi Patrice met in the Foreign Legion. Catherine stays faithful to François, although she meets a young Frenchman who fought for the Republicans in Spain and who turns out to be the young Patrice she had met while he was a child in the 1920s. Meanwhile, the elder Patrice marries a young German woman. The book ends with Catherine on her way to visit François in hospital in Spain after learning that he has been seriously wounded at the front.

The title of the book stems from the seven styles in which it is written: a narrative of Patrice and Catherine's time together in the 1920s; letters exchanged between Patrice and Catherine while Patrice is in Italy; Patrice's journal entries while he is in Germany; a series of reflections or maxims, mainly on the process of aging and turning 30; dialogue, in the form of a play, between François and Catherine and Catherine and Patrice in the mid-1930s; a series of "documents" François has put together in a scrap book about the Spanish Civil War; and finally a "speech" ("discours"), in which Catherine describes her thoughts as she travels to meet François in hospital.

The book is very sympathetic to fascism as a regenerating ideology. However, given his future as a collaborator, readers may be surprised that Communism and socialism are not attacked outright and that the "Patrice" character mentions several times that Nazism may not be as enduring as fascism and that Frenchmen may have to fight the Germans in the future. Also, it is of note that Catherine, who calls herself a "petite bourgeoise" and who exemplifies French rationalism (and perhaps represents France herself) as noted in the dialogue section, chooses François, the French/native fascist and turns away from Patrice, who has immersed himself in Italian and German ideology.

1943 La Conquérante (The Conqueror; gender suggests a female conqueror)
1944 Poèmes (Poems)
1944 Poèmes

Non-fiction
1931 Présence de Virgile (The Presence of Virgil)
1932 Le Procès de Jeanne d'Arc (edited and introduced by Robert Brasillach) (The Trial of Joan of Arc)
1935 Portraits. Barrès, Proust, Maurras, Colette, Giraudoux, Morand, Cocteau, Malraux, etc., (Portraits)
1935 (re-edited in 1943) Histoire du Cinéma, two volumes (with Maurice Bardèche)
1936, Animateurs de théâtre (Theater Directors/Organizers)
1936 Léon Degrelle et l'avenir de « Rex » (Léon Degrelle and the Future of  Rexist Party)
 1936 Les Cadets de l'Alcazar (with Henri Massis, see French Wikipedia) (The Cadets of the Alcazar); later renamed the Defenders of the Alcazar
This short work chronicles the siege of the Alcazar in Toledo by Republican forces in 1936 during the Spanish Civil War. While it lionises the defenders, Brasillach does not shy from mentioning the execution of the Republican prisoners in Toledo's hospitals after the relief of the city and the Alcazar. The author also discounts certain elements of Nationalist propaganda concerning La Pasionaria, Communist Dolores Ibárruri. The work remains heavily pro-Nationalist, with Falangist and Carlist songs reprinted in its pages.
1938 Pierre Corneille, a biography of the famous dramatist
 1939 Histoire de la guerre d’Espagne (with Maurice Bardèche) (History of the Spanish Civil War)
1941 Notre avant-guerre (Our pre-war)
 1944 Les Quatre Jeudis (The Four Thursdays) A series of articles about literature, literary figures, trends, politics and society largely published in the press earlier in Brasillach's career (drawn from articles often originally printed on Thursdays).

Posthumously published works
1945 Poèmes de Fresnes
1946 Lettre à un soldat de la classe 60 (Letter to a Soldier of the Class of 1960).
In this 'letter', written while Brasillach was awaiting trial, the author expressed his thoughts and hopes to a future generation. He argued that he had few regrets about his social and political role in World War II era France. He admitted that certain excesses had occurred under the occupation but contrasted the Germans’ worst crimes against Frenchmen (e.g. Oradour-sur-Glane massacre) to the well documented atrocities committed by the French in their colonial empire, especially Indochina. He re-iterated his commitment to anti-semitism, although he insisted that he did not know of and entirely repudiated the holocaust despite having advocated the deportations of French Jewry. In the letter Brasillach insists that Franco-German relations would inevitably continue to improve and that the occupation had ultimately brought the two nations closer together. While these statements would have shocked many at the time, when one considers the rapid rapprochement between the two nations post-war, the general idea of Franco-German unity he expressed in some way presages the development of Franco-German cooperation and the pivotal role of the two nations in the European Community/Union, although the causes of this rapprochement may not have been what he foresaw. Brasillach also re-iterated his commitment to fascism and argued that, whether it survived as an ideology or not, the generation of the class of 1960 would doubtless look back on and consider German fascism with a sense of awe. Brasillach also argued that he believed that the spirit of fascism should be mixed with the English sense of liberty and free expression, despite the apparent contradiction in terms.

1947 Chénier, La Pensée française (Chénier: French Thought)
1950 Anthologie de la poésie grecque (Anthology of Greek Poetry) 
1952 Lettres écrites en prison (Letters Written in Prison)
1953 Six heures à perdre (Six Hours to Kill)
1954 Bérénice (Berenice) (play, first run - 1957)
1955 Journal d'un homme occupé (Journal of a (Pre)Occupied Man)
1961 Poètes oubliés (Forgotten Poets)
1961 Dom Rémy
1962 Commentaire sur La Varende (Commentary on La Varende)
1963 En marge de Daphnis et Chloé (On the Edge of Daphnis and Chloé)
1963 Nouvelle prière sur l'Acropole (New Prayer on the Acropolis)
1967 Écrit à Fresnes (Written at Fresnes)
1968 Une génération dans l'orage (A Generation in the Storm)
1970 Vingt lettres de Robert Brasillach (Twenty Letters)
1971 Abel Bonnard biography
1974 Les Captifs incomplete novel
1984 Le Paris de Balzac (Balzac's Paris)
1985 Hugo et le snobisme révolutionnaire (Hugo and Revolutionary Snobbism)
1985 Montherlant entre les hommes et les femmes (Montherlant between Men and Women)
1992 Fulgur novel, compilation
1999 La Question juive, articles de Brasillach et Cousteau (The Jewish Question: Articles by Brasillach and Cousteau)
2002 Relectures Robert Brasillach (Re-reading Robert Brasillach)

References

 Bibliography

Further reading
 Fascist Ego: A Political Biography of Robert Brasillach by William R. Tucker 
 The Ideological Hero in the Novels of Robert Brasillach, Roger Vailland & Andre Malraux by Peter D. Tame 
 Translation of Notre Avant-Guerre/Before the War by Robert Brasillach, Peter Tame

External links
 Photograph
 Killed for His Words by Richard Corliss
 NOXIOUS WORDS, HEINOUS ACTS, THE POWER OF SPEECH by Kim Koster
 Robert Fulford's column about Marguerite Duras & Robert Brasillach from The National Post

1909 births
1945 deaths
People from Perpignan
French fascists
French literary critics
Writers from Occitania (administrative region)
French LGBT writers
People affiliated with Action Française
French anti-communists
20th-century French novelists
20th-century French male writers
French male novelists
Lycée Louis-le-Grand alumni
École Normale Supérieure alumni
French military personnel of World War II
French prisoners of war in World War II
World War II prisoners of war held by Germany
Executed writers
People executed by the Provisional Government of the French Republic
Nazi collaborators shot at the Fort de Montrouge
Executed people from Languedoc-Roussillon
French male non-fiction writers
20th-century French LGBT people